Acrocercops hexaclosta is a moth of the family Gracillariidae, known from Java, Indonesia. It was described by Edward Meyrick in 1934. The hostplant for the species is an unidentified species of Macaranga.

References

hexaclosta
Moths of Asia
Moths described in 1934